Anne-Maria Suzanne Tanke (born 27 February 1978) is a Dutch former cricketer who played primarily as a right-arm leg break bowler. She appeared in one Test match, 39 One Day Internationals and five Twenty20 Internationals for the Netherlands between 1997 and 2010.

References

External links
 
 

1978 births
Living people
People from Velsen
Dutch women cricketers
Netherlands women Test cricketers
Netherlands women One Day International cricketers
Netherlands women Twenty20 International cricketers
Sportspeople from North Holland